Claro TV+ is a Latin American operator of Pay television. The service is supplied by Embratel and Claro companies and operates in Star One C4 satellite. Its transmission system is DTH (Direct to Home) in Ku Band, and the channels are encrypted by Nagravision 3 system. The reception is made via mini-satellite dish and a DVB-S2 receiver, and subscribers authentication is made by conditional access card. As of October 2011, Via Embratel had achieved 2,000,000 subscribers.

In Brazil, it was launched as Via Embratel on December 16, 2008, and it was acquired by Claro on March 1, 2012, with the same service, price, payment method, programming, features and quality. The contract remained the same and the invoice was identified by Claro TV, together with Embratel Livre (which became Claro Fixo). On the same day, the Warner Channel debuted in HD. Via Embratel had operations throughout Brazil, as it operated in the satellite pay TV sector. Via Embratel Banda Larga and Via Embratel Fone were only available in some cities in the states of Mato Grosso, Pará, Piauí, Rio de Janeiro, Rio Grande do Norte, Maranhão and São Paulo. On June 2, 2010 it started selling packages with HD transmission, initially to the states of São Paulo and Rio de Janeiro. Nine channels debuted and were added to the 4 main packages.

In Puerto Rico, Claro is deploying VRADs in order to launch its IPTV service which will work parallel with their current satellite service.

Coverage

Claro TV+ SATHD Regional DTH has operations throughout Brazil. Two of the most popular broadcast networks, however, are not available nationwide:
 TV Globo national and local affiliates are only available for the 19 most populous markets.
 Futura national feed (operated by TV Globo).
 SBT national feed is available for most Brazilian states (except SP, RJ, DF, RS, SC, PA, PR).

Claro hdtv is available in Puerto Rico via satellite and is currently testing their IPTV infrastructure with some customers. General availability is expected in early 2013.

See also 
 Claro-musica

References

External links 
 Claro TV (official website)
 Claro TV Brasil package at Lyngsat

Satellite television
América Móvil
Television in Brazil